Diego Martín Alaniz Ávila (born 19 February 1993) is an Uruguayan footballer who plays for Orense S.C. on loan from Delfín S.C. in Ecuador, as a winger.

Club career
Born in Melo, Alaniz was a Defensor Sporting youth graduate. He was loaned to Juventud de Las Piedras in September 2011, making his debut on 15 October by coming on as a late substitute in a 1–0 win against Villa Teresa. He scored his first goal late in the month, netting the game's only in a success over Tacuarembó.

After achieving top level promotion with Juventud, Alaniz returned to Defensor but was not utilized. In January 2013 he moved to River Plate, making his debut for the club on 24 March by replacing Lucas Olaza in a 2–4 loss at Liverpool.

In July 2014, Alaniz was loaned to Mexican club Monarcas Morelia. He subsequently represented Argentinos Juniors, Chapecoense and Real Oviedo, all in temporary deals.

References

External links

1993 births
Living people
People from Melo, Uruguay
Association football wingers
Uruguayan footballers
Uruguayan expatriate footballers
Argentine Primera División players
Uruguayan Primera División players
Campeonato Brasileiro Série A players
Ecuadorian Serie A players
Ascenso MX players
Liga MX players
Segunda División players
Israeli Premier League players
Defensor Sporting players
Juventud de Las Piedras players
Club Atlético River Plate (Montevideo) players
Atlético Morelia players
Associação Chapecoense de Futebol players
Real Oviedo players
Argentinos Juniors footballers
Racing Club de Montevideo players
Guayaquil City F.C. footballers
Liverpool F.C. (Montevideo) players
Hapoel Ra'anana A.F.C. players
Cafetaleros de Chiapas footballers
Delfín S.C. footballers
Orense S.C. players
Uruguayan expatriate sportspeople in Mexico
Uruguayan expatriate sportspeople in Brazil
Uruguayan expatriate sportspeople in Israel
Uruguayan expatriate sportspeople in Argentina
Uruguayan expatriate sportspeople in Spain
Uruguayan expatriate sportspeople in Ecuador
Expatriate footballers in Mexico
Expatriate footballers in Brazil
Expatriate footballers in Israel
Expatriate footballers in Argentina
Expatriate footballers in Spain
Expatriate footballers in Ecuador